The Men's under-23 road race of the 2019 UCI Road World Championships was a cycling event that took place on 27 September 2019 from Doncaster to Harrogate in Yorkshire, England. It was the 24th edition of the event. The race was won by Italian rider Samuele Battistella in a group sprint of six riders.

Final classification

References

Men's under-23 road race
UCI Road World Championships – Men's under-23 road race
2019 in men's road cycling